First Potteries is a bus company based in Stoke-on-Trent operating services in North Staffordshire, England. It is a part of First Midlands and a subsidiary of FirstGroup.

History

The company began life as Potteries Motor Traction. As part of the privatisation of the National Bus Company, PMT Limited was created on 12 December 1986 when it was purchased by its management and employees. The team leading PMT's buyout were managing director Mike Moors, traffic manager Steve Ellis, chief engineer Barry Parkinson and company secretary Nigel Barrett.

Expansion came quickly for PMT, and it had commenced operations outside its traditional North Staffordshire area a little over six weeks prior to purchase from NBC. On 25 October 1986, the day bus services in the UK were deregulated, a small outstation was established in the neighbouring town of Crewe. This was followed by a venture into Merseyside with the opening of a Red Rider outstation at Moreton on the Wirral Peninsula. A small operation in Leeds commenced in 1988, followed a year later by the winning of tenders in the West Midlands. This led to vehicles being outstationed at a haulage company's yard in Willenhall.

On 6 February 1990, PMT purchased the Wirral, Ellesmere Port and Chester operations of Crosville Motor Services from the Drawlane Group. PMT was later purchased by Badgerline before they in turn merged with GRT Group and formed FirstBus. The sale including the former Crosville operations in Chester and Wirral.

A network of services in Chester was acquired through the purchase of ChesterBus in 2007. This business was integrated with the existing First Chester & The Wirral which already ran a network of services in these areas. The Chester & Wirral operations were sold to Stagecoach Merseyside in December 2012.

First Potteries now operates mainly urban services in and around Stoke-on-Trent, Newcastle-under-Lyme and the surrounding towns and villages.  Route numbers change & some buses have been repainted in the new livery as well as Wi-Fi being provided free of charge on newer buses.

Liveries
The traditional colours of the PMT fleet were red and cream. During National Bus Company ownership in the 1970s and 1980s, poppy red and white livery was used. Following privatisation, the livery became red and yellow with the fleetname in a 'zipper' logo. Despite this, several variations were introduced to suit individual routes – Silverdale Shuttle and Bradwell Shuttle, which saw the red replaced with blue; Hospitalslink, a scheme used exclusively on a handful of minibuses and which was green-based; and Birches Head Townabout, again a minibus operation and which received a yellow and orange livery. Additionally, a pair of minibuses gained a purple and white and then yellow and black variant to promote the Ball Green to Tunstall service. In 1987 PMT purchased Turners of Brown Edge and until the late 1990s some vehicles in the fleet were painted into Turners Tudor Maroon and Cream to work the 8 Hanley-Brown Edge service, subsequently extended from Brown Edge to Endon.

All these liveries have now been completely superseded by the FirstGroup corporate livery. In 2011 four buses were repainted in PMT red and yellow when routes 25 and 26 were launched as gold services.

For the 2016 open day at Adderley Green Garage two further Wright Gemini double decker buses were repainted, one of which is in the old style red and cream PMT livery. The other in silver, red and yellow, a heritage livery used on the original 6 Leyland Olympians introduced in 1989 for the 320 Hanley-Crewe route.

Administration
In 2010, FirstGroup changed the management structure of First Potteries. The Staffordshire area operations are now part of First Midlands (which consists of First Leicester and First Wyvern) with its group office at Adderley Green, Stoke-on-Trent. The Cheshire and Merseyside area depots became part of First Manchester. These were subsequently sold to Stagecoach in 2012.

Crewe depot has been closed and has transferred vehicles and services to Newcastle-under-Lyme. In October 2013 First Potteries took responsibility for First Midlands' depots in Hereford and Worcester.

Fleet
As of March 2013 the fleet consisted of 185 buses.

First Potteries received its first new buses in 8 years in 2014, when nine brand new Wright Streetlite Max MicroHybrid vehicles were delivered to Adderley Green depot. A tenth was delivered in 2015, which was the first bus within FirstGroup to have a Euro6 engine.

Further new buses were bought in October 2016, with new Alexander Dennis Enviro 200 MMCs used on routes 21, 21A, 23 and 23A.

Depot
First Potteries operations are based in the Adderley Green area of Stoke-on-Trent. A small number of buses use an outstation in Newcastle-under-Lyme.

See also
Potteries Electric Traction Company
List of bus operators of the United Kingdom

References

External links
Company website
Stoke-on-Trent Bus Information website

Companies based in Stoke-on-Trent
FirstGroup bus operators in England
Transport in Stoke-on-Trent
Potteries Urban Area